Terry Deering (November 7, 1958 – June 26, 1997) was an American legislator and coal miner who served as a Democratic member of the Illinois House of Representatives from January 1991 until his death in June 1997.

Biographical sketch
Born in DuQuoin, Illinois, Deering went to Nashville High School in Nashville, Illinois. He was a coal miner and then served as Mayor of Du Bois, Illinois. In the 1990 general election Deering defeated Republican incumbent Charles Wayne Goforth in what was regarded as an upset.
He served in the Illinois House of Representatives, as a Democrat, from 1990 until his death. He died in an auto accident near Du Bois, Illinois. Local Democratic Party leaders appointed Dan Reitz, a County Commissioner in Randolph County, to succeed Deering.

Notes

External links

1958 births
1997 deaths
People from Du Quoin, Illinois
People from Washington County, Illinois
American coal miners
Road incident deaths in Illinois
Mayors of places in Illinois
Democratic Party members of the Illinois House of Representatives
20th-century American politicians